La7 is an Italian free-to-air television channel owned by Cairo Communication. Until 2013 it was a pay-TV channel owned by Telecom Italia Media and operated by Telecom Italia.

Signal overspill means that parts of Albania, Croatia, Switzerland, Malta, Montenegro, Monaco and Slovenia also receive La7 broadcasts.

History

Telemontecarlo

Telemontecarlo (TMC) was the Italian language television channel from the Principality of Monaco. Telemontecarlo was founded in 1974 in the Principality of Monaco. During that time, the channel was one of the only two competitors of Italian public television network RAI, broadcasting in colour (TV Koper-Capodistria launched in 1971). Since the introduction of Mediaset channels, TMC survived with some difficulties until 2001, but already in 1999 the last owner, the film producer Vittorio Cecchi Gori, sold the network to SEAT Pagine Gialle.

The first show transmitted by Telemontecarlo was Un peu d'amour, d'amitié et beaucoup de musique ("A Little Bit of Love, Friendship and a Lot of Music"), hosted by Jocelyn, who couldn't speak proper Italian at the time.

On 12 March 1982, RAI acquired the remaining 10% of the network. On 4 August 1985, Brazilian company Organizações Globo acquired the remaining 90%. The programming changed and included more Brazilian programmes like telenovelas and other television series. The channel also broadcast the Rio Carnival live. In general, the channel adopted the same station identification and commercial bumpers from Rede Globo, the largest commercial TV network in South America and the second-largest commercial TV network in annual revenue worldwide just behind the American ABC Television Network and the largest producer of telenovelas, with the music and graphics being adapted for the channel.

In 1992, Telemontecarlo became a member of the European Broadcasting Union where they were broadcast parts of 1992 Summer Olympics, the 1992 America's Cup and the UEFA Euro 1992 football championship.

In 1994, Italian film producer Vittorio Cecchi Gori, who at that time already owner of Videomusic, acquired TMC, and then, in 1996, created TMC2 to compete with RAI and Mediaset networks. However, his intentions were thwarted and ratings were at an all-time low, because the channel lacked nationwide coverage in Italy. It was also at the time, in 1992, Organizações Globo took 15% of the shares in the new third TV channel in Portugal, SIC, which may have hurt TMC.

In 1996, the channel also tried to acquire the television rights of Serie A, competing against RAI. On 10 March 2000 the channel broadcast the Italian premiere of Sex and the City.

In 1999 Vittorio Cecchi Gori sold the network to SEAT Pagine Gialle (part of Telecom Italia holding) and the channel moved from its historical headquarters in Monte Carlo to a new building in Rome.

La7
In 2001, Lorenzo Pellicioli and Roberto Colaninno of Telecom Italia announced they had acquired Telemontecarlo, to create a strong competitor against the six other national channels in Italy. On 24 June 2001, the network changed the station name to La7.

Against the initial premises, like the hiring of popular TV hosts, anchors and journalists,  La7 ratings and shares were much lower than its major competitors. However, in 2010–2011, the channel began doubling its rates, also thanks to current News director Enrico Mentana and his news program TG La7. 

On 4 March 2013, it was announced the acquisition by Urbano Cairo's Cairo Editore. The sale was effective from 30 April 2013.

Programmes

Shows
 G'Day with Geppi Cucciari, evening comedy show, airing at 19:20 every weekday;
 (ah)iPiroso with Antonello Piroso, former La7 News & Sports director, and former tennis player Adriano Panatta, and writer Fulvio Abbate; It airs every weekday (late night show);
 25a Ora – Il Cinema Espanso (hosted by Davide Dileo, founder of Subsonica); it airs at about midnight on Fridays and Saturdays;
 Italialand Nuove attrazioni, comedy show hosted by Maurizio Crozza, airing every Friday at 21:10;
 I Menù di Benedetta, cooking show hosted by Benedetta Parodi, airing at 12:25 every weekday;
 Interno Giorno, afternoon movie block, airing old Italian and US movies every weekday at 14:00;
 La Valigia dei Sogni, weekend and summer late night movie block; the movie is introduced by Simone Annichiarico; from July to August 2011 it will be airing on Monday nights at 21:10;
 Ma anche no, an Italian entertainment television news programme hosted by Antonello Piroso, airing every Sunday at 14:05;
 Chef per un Giorno, celebrity cooking talent show hosted by professional chefs Sergio Maria Teutonico, Maurizio Di Mario, Velia De Angelis and Alessio Pizzi, airing every weekend;

Talk shows

 Le Invasioni Barbariche, with Daria Bignardi;
 Coffee Break, daily morning talk show hosted by Tiziana Panella and Enrico Vaime; weather reports are narrated by meteorologist Paolo Sottocorona.
 Propaganda Live every Friday night, created and hosted by Diego Bianchi and cartoonist Marco "Makkox" Dambrosio.

News programmes
 TG La7, main news program, directed by Enrico Mentana;
 Omnibus, morning news block hosted by TG La7 anchorpersons Manuela Ferri, Edgardo Gulotta, Andrea Molino, Andrea Pancani and Alessandra Sardoni; weather forecasts are presented by meteorologist Paolo Sottocorona;
 Gli Intoccabili, with Gianluigi Nuzzi every Wednesday at 23:10;
 L'Infedele, Monday night review with Gad Lerner;
 Otto e mezzo, access prime time information programme hosted by Lilli Gruber, airing every weekday at 20:35 after TG La7; in Summer time it is substituted by In Onda;
 In Onda access prime time information programme hosted by journalists Luca Telese and Nicola Porro, airing every weekend at 20:35 after TG La7; in Summer time it substitutes Otto e mezzo every weekday;
 Piazzapulita Prime time politic talk show directed by Corrado Formigli, airing every Thursday at 21:10 after Otto e mezzo.
 L'aria che tira, business programme hosted by Myrta Merlino;

Cultural programmes
 Atlantide – Storie di uomini e di mondi, main documentary evening block airing every weekday, hosted by Natasha Lusenti (now by Greta Mauro);
 Impero, hosted by Valerio Massimo Manfredi;
 Due minuti Un libro, book-related programme hosted by Alain Elkann;
 Prehistoric Park, documentary;
 Missione Natura, summer time nature programme, hosted by biologist and ornithologist Vincenzo Venuto, with external intervention of herpetologist Austin Stevens.

TV series and miniseries

 The Kennedys
 Leverage
 Hustle
 Sex and the City
 The L Word
 Dirt
 Charmed
 A Touch of Frost
 Cold Squad
 Crossing Jordan
 Due South
 F/X: The Series
 Grey's Anatomy
 In the Heat of the Night
 MacGyver
 Matlock
 Midsomer Murders
 Mike Hammer
 Murder Call
 New Tricks
 Relic Hunter
 Remington Steele
 Saving Hope
 Sex and the City
 Sliders
 Star Trek: The Original Series
 Star Trek: Deep Space Nine
 Stargate SG-1
 The Borgias
 The Commish
 The District
 The Practice
 This Is Wonderland
 Touched by an Angel
 Undercover Boss
 Unforgettable

Sports events
 Six Nations Championship
 America's Cup
 Superbike World Championship
 Coppa Italia matches
 Super Bowl
 Superstars Series
 Supercopa de España

Defunct Italian programmes
 Crozza Italia (known as Italialand in 2011), comedy show hosted by Maurizio Crozza, airing four episodes in May 2011 at 21:10;
 Cuochi e Fiamme, cooking talent show hosted by professional chef Simone Rugiati, with collaboration of Fiammetta Fadda, Riccardo Rossi and Chiara Maci (as "judges"), airing every weekday (now on La7d);
 Fratelli e Sorelle d'Italia, comedy and historical show hosted by Veronica Pivetti with collaboration of Carlo Lucarelli, Ascanio Celestini, Paolo Hendel, Virginia Raffaele and Lillo & Greg, airing every Friday night at 21:10;
 La Gaia Scienza, scientific comedy show hosted by geologist Mario Tozzi and the comedian group Trio Medusa (1 season);
 Victor Victoria, late night weekday show hosted by Victoria Cabello, Geppi Cucciari, singer Arisa and MelissaP (4 seasons);
 Stargate – Linea di Confine, documentary series, replaced by Impero (9 seasons);
 Exit, prime time talk hosted by Ilaria D'Amico (5 seasons);
 Niente di Personale, with Antonello Piroso;
 Tetris, prime time talk show hosted by Luca Telese (2 seasons);
 I Fantastici 5, Italian version of Queer Eye for the Straight Guy (1 season);
 Markette, late night weekday show hosted by Piero Chiambretti (2 seasons);
 100%, game show hosted by Gigio D'Ambrosio (1 season); it has been the only game show aired by La7 so far;
 Altra Storia, history deepening programme (5 seasons);
 Il Processo di Biscardi, sport review programme hosted by Aldo Biscardi (now moved on 7 Gold Channel);
 Wife Swap (4 seasons, now on Fox Life and Cielo);
 Il Contratto, hosted by Sabrina Nobile, aired until April 2011 every Wednesday night at 21:10;

Cartoons and animes
 Dragon Ball
 Dragon Ball Z
 Dragon Ball GT
 Pokémon
 Digimon

References

External links

 Official Websites (in Italian): la7.it, la7.tv
 La7 channel on YouTube
 History of TMC (1974–2001) 
 Birth of La7 (2001) 

Telecom Italia Media
Television channels in Italy
Television channels and stations established in 2001
Italian-language television stations